Sarah Byford is economist André professor of health economics and director of King's Health Economics (KHE) at the Institute of Psychiatry, Psychology and Neuroscience. She specializes in the economic evaluation of mental health services and clinical and economic evaluation of complex interventions, including services for children and adolescents.

She is a senior economics advisor at the Social Care Institute for Excellence, a member of the National Institute for Health and Care Excellence Public Health Interventions Advisory Committee (PHIAC), Associate Editor of the British Journal of Psychiatry and a Mental Health Review Journal editorial board member.

Academic career 
Byford began her academic career by completing a BSc (Hons) in economics at Brunel University. She continued her education by attaining an MSc, first in health economics (1993) and then health sciences (2004) at the University of York. Byford was awarded her PhD in health economics at King's College, London in 2009.

Employment 
Byford held a number of research roles between 1992 and 2000. She became a senior lecturer at the Centre for the Economics of Mental Health, Institute of Psychiatry, King's College London in 2000 and held this position until 2009. Byford held the position of reader at the Centre for the Economics of Mental Health from 2009 to 2012. During this time she was also the senior economics advisor, Social Care Institute for Excellence, London (2010–2011).

Byford is currently the professor and co-deputy director of health economics at the Centre for the Economics of Mental and Physical Health, Institute of Psychiatry.

Editorial roles 
Byford holds key editorial roles at a number of journals:

 2013–present   Social Psychiatry and Psychiatric Epidemiology editorial board
 2011–present   Royal College of Psychiatrists Publication Management Board
 2007–present   British Journal of Psychiatry associate editor
 2007–present   Mental Health Review Journal editorial board member

Bibliography

References

Living people
Alumni of Brunel University London
Alumni of the University of York
Alumni of King's College London
Academics of King's College London
British women academics
Health economists
British women psychologists
Year of birth missing (living people)